Saxby Pass is a snow-covered pass through Lyttelton Range, Admiralty Mountains, south of Lange Peak. The pass was used by a New Zealand Antarctic Research Program (NZARP) field party led by R.H. Findlay, 1981–82, in travel between Atkinson Glacier and Dennistoun Glacier. Named by New Zealand Antarctic Place-Names Committee (NZ-APC) after Eric Saxby.

Mountain passes of Victoria Land
Pennell Coast